Dear Boy or Dear Boys may refer to:

Books
Dear boy : the life of Keith Moon by Tony Fletcher (2005)
Dear Boy, a collection of poems by Emily Berry
Dear Boys, a 2003 sports manga by Hiroki Yagami

Film and TV
"Dear Boy" (Angel), an episode of TV series Angel

Music
"Dear Boy" (song), a 1971 song by Paul McCartney
"Dear Boy", a song by Avicii from the 2013 album True 
"Dear Boys", a song by Keisuke Kuwata
"Dear Boys", a song by Latterman